Acrolophus chiricahuae is a moth of the family Acrolophidae. It is found in North America, including Arizona.

References

chiricahuae
Moths described in 1964